Sadistik Exekution was an Australian extreme metal band from Sydney. The band formed in 1985, although their main active period was from 1986 until 2004. Known for their outrageous live show antics, notorious behaviour and non conformist attitude, Sadistik Exekution also wrote, recorded and performed their own extreme form of death metal. Throughout their career, the band members have firmly stated they should not at all be confused with or wrongly labelled as 'black metal'. Ironically however, the band was also quite influential on some of the early Scandinavian black metal bands, as well as other extreme metal bands from around the world. Their last official live show was in Sydney in 1999, although they did re-unite once more in November 2009, to perform as the main act at the first annual Australian Metal Awards in Sydney.

History

Early years 
The band first came together after bass player Dave Slave met vocalist Rok outside an Iron Maiden concert in Sydney in May 1985. For the remainder of that year and into the first half of 1986, Dave and Rok rehearsed with a number of different guitarists and drummers and began writing material. However, the problem of finding reliable musicians that were capable of playing this extreme form of metal seemed ongoing. Eventually, Dave Slave and Rok decided to try their luck by temporarily relocating to Melbourne through the middle of 1986.

During this period, Slave had appeared on the talent-quest segment of the iconic Australian TV program Hey Hey It's Saturday and after playing a bass solo, he proceeded to throw his custom made American made BC Rich bass guitar to the floor, breaking it beyond repair. This was also around the time they met their future guitarist, the Rev. Kriss Hades. However, due to various factors, Slave and Rok eventually returned to Sydney in September 1986, leaving Hades behind.

At the same time, former Slaughter Lord guitarist Sandy Vahdani had been rehearsing some new material with a drummer called Sloth. Interestingly, Sloth happened to be distantly related to Dave Slave and both Sandy and Dave had previously been in a small time local Sydney thrash band called Hammer's Thrust. By the end of September, the four officially united as Sadistik Exekution and began writing songs that would eventually be recorded on the band's debut album. Before the end of 1986 they had planned to include Rev. Kriss Hades in the line up, as a five piece act, but this didn't eventuate.

While the band continued to rehearse and write new material, Dave Slave and Rok relentlessly pursued local publicity, while Rok also began his correspondence with key members of the then embryonic Norwegian and Swedish black metal scenes. Euronymous from Mayhem can be seen wearing one of the band's t-shirts in several photographs from the late 1980s and early 90s and Rok was also in regular contact with Jon 'Metalion' Kristiansen, of Slayer magazine fame. Rok also had correspondence with Quorthon of Bathory and a number of other bands and identities who went on to become more well known.

Unfortunately though, problems continued to plague the band and despite them being very close to playing live in Sydney several times from 1987 to 1989, one thing or another was always there to stop them. In March 1988 the band went into the studio to record The Magus album and once again, problem after problem delayed their progress. After countless delays and difficulties, The Magus album was finally released in June 1991 by the Sydney label Vampire Records.

This year also marked the first live performances of the band in Sydney and Melbourne. Sandy had left the band soon after The Magus recording sessions and Rev. Kriss Hades had moved to Sydney and became a full time member in 1989. They very quickly established themselves as a formidable live act during 1991, with outrageous antics, onstage fighting, amps blowing up, crowd violence and generally absurd behaviour. All the while though, they took their music quite seriously and despite their appearance and manner, the incredibly fast and technically advanced songs were always at the heart of their shows and recordings.

We Are Death 
In 1993, Sloth left the band (which he did several times over the years) soon after they had recorded most of the material their second album. Replacement drummer, Steve 'The Mechanik' Hoban played on one track, which was Astral Abortis. A demo tape featuring the core songs of the album was sent to French label Osmose Productions. Originally intended to be called 'Spiritual Dynamix', the words We Are Death... Fukk You! were printed on the demo tapes. This being a reaction to what they believed was constant misrepresentation as being labelled a black metal band. The label mistook these words to be the title of the album and released it under that name. It soon became a successful release for the label and in 1995 the band was flown to Europe, to be part of a tour with Finnish band Impaled Nazarene and American act Absu.

The Mechanik had injured his back at a Bolt Thrower concert in Sydney only weeks before the tour, resulting in an extended hospital stay in a major Sydney hospital's spinal injuries unit. So he was unable to play drums for many months afterwards and the band had no choice but to quickly search for a replacement drummer.

Melbourne based drummer Matt 'Skitz' Sanders from the band Damaged was recruited and rushed into rehearsals for the tour. After the first few dates of the tour, it was soon realised that the other Sadistik Exekution members were behaving in an unprofessional manner, resulting in various problems. It was during this tour that one of the most famous incidents in the band's history occurred. With only a few more dates to be played in Italy and Germany, Dave Slave, Kriss Hades and Rok began fighting and causing damage to the tour bus. After a short period, their behaviour got out of control and the bus was stopped while tour management and the bus drivers were deciding how to deal with the situation. Eventually the tour proceeded, although the guitarist Kriss Hades struggled to play the rest of the shows with a badly broken finger. Upon returning to Australia, Sadistik Exekution ceased all activity for many several months while Hades recovered. The band's outrageous behaviour during this tour also meant that the band were never invited to return to Europe for any further tours or live shows for the remainder of the decade and beyond.

K.A.O.S. 
With Sloth back in the band once more, Sadistik Exekution spent most of 1996 working on their third album KAOS, which was initially released through Australian label Shock Records in May 1997. A mini EP called Sadistik Elektrokution was also released by Shock Records in 1998 which featured remixed versions of a few previous songs as well as a bass solo by Dave Slave.

KAOS was then released again in 1998 by Osmose Productions and this version had a few small differences in the artwork and layout. Faster and rawer than anything they had produced before, this album saw the beginning of a particularly active period for the band, with a steady stream of live performances and other projects. Dave Slave had been working on an album of electronic rock n' roll for several years, finally releasing it under the name Digital Fiction in 1998 through a Brisbane distributor called Oracle. Rok also recorded two solo albums, with Osmose releasing the first, This is Satanik in 1998 and Melbourne's Modern Invasion Music releasing the second, Burning Metal in the year 2000. Rev. Kriss Hades had now temporarily joined the Sydney black metal band Nazxul, who he recorded and played live with. Sloth also recorded a series of demos, mainly consisting of some of his many punk rock songs under the name Bog.

At the end of 1998, shortly after Rok had performed a solo show, Sadistik Exekution reconvened to play a New Year's Eve gig. It was billed as their last show ever, but the band had often advertised their performances this way. However, only months later, in 1999 they took to the stage again at Sydney's Globe Theatre in the suburb of Newtown. This time it did end up being the bands last live performance. The band remained dormant for the remainder of the year, as Hades toured with Nazxul and the others concerned themselves with personal projects once more. Kriss Hades also began piecing together several tracks that would eventually make up his solo debut.

The band maintained that it had ended as a live act, but when the line-up for the year 2000 Metal for the Brain festival in Canberra was announced, Sadistik Exekution was billed as one of the headliners. While anticipation among fans was high that the country's most notorious metal band was finally making an appearance at Australia's biggest metal event, Dave Slave broke his leg in an incident only weeks before the show and the band had to withdraw.

Final recordings 
A further two Sadistik Exekution albums were recorded, the first, Fukk released in 2002 and the second, simply called Fukk II, appearing 18 months later. Dave Slave has often affirmed that the band is no more, claiming to be busy with his solo act Doomed and Disgusting and other musical pursuits. Kriss Hades has established himself as a solo artist, producing an album of noise and dark ambience in 2002. He also maintains a parallel career as an underground illustration artist. Rok also moved further into the art world and eventually became a highly respected and sought-after illustrator for other heavy metal bands and labels around the world. Sloth distanced himself from the other Sadistik Exekution members.  However, he continued to play as a session drummer with various low key rock and metal bands around the local Australian live pub and club circuit.

Sadistik Exekution made a live return in November 2009 as the featured act at the Australian Metal Awards in Sydney. Leading up to the event, Rok was interviewed on radio station JJJ's leading heavy metal show 'The Racket' with Andrew Haug. He spoke at length with Andrew of his many adventures over the years as well as the upcoming live performance. During the interview, Rok made no further comments about Sadistik Exekution recording further albums. Later that month they appeared to a capacity crowd at Sydney's Fox Studios for the Australian Heavy Metal awards night, where they were given the final spot for the night.

Despite many invitations to perform at various events and festivals within Australia and Europe over the following years, the band always declined such offers. However, founding members Rok and Dave Slave have continued to work together with post band business activities, including merchandise, label and legal matters.

Discography

Albums

Singles

External links
 https://osmoseproductions-label.com/bands/sadistik-exekution/
https://www.facebook.com/profile.php?id=100050238170215

Musical groups from Sydney
Australian heavy metal musical groups
Australian death metal musical groups